Shawty may refer to:

Shawty (slang), term of endearment, or catcall
"Shawty" (Plies song), a 2007 single by Plies
"Shawty" (Luciano song), 2020 song by Luciano

People
 Shawty Lo (1976–2016), American rapper
 Shawty Redd (born 1983), American record producer, rapper, and songwriter

See also 
 Shorty (disambiguation)
 "Get It Shawty", a 2007 song by Lloyd
 "Shawty Get Loose", a 2008 single by Lil Mama
 "Shawty Say", a 2008 song by David Banner
 "Shawty Wus Up", a 2010 song by Dondria
 "Money Bag Shawty", an episode of Atlanta
 Hey Shawty (disambiguation)